Brownstown is an unincorporated community in Yakima County, Washington, United States. Brownstown has a post office with ZIP code 98920.

It is a loosely-knit farming community within the Yakama Nation Reservation approximately halfway between Wapato and White Swan.  USPS Post Office for Brownstown is at the intersection of Branch Road with Brownstown Road.

References

Unincorporated communities in Yakima County, Washington
Unincorporated communities in Washington (state)